Agama wachirai, the Marsabit rock agama, is a species of lizard in the family Agamidae. It is a small lizard endemic to Kenya.

References

Agama (genus)
Reptiles described in 2021
Agamid lizards of Africa
Reptiles of Kenya
Endemic fauna of Kenya
Taxa named by Aaron M. Bauer
Taxa named by Patrick K. Malonza
Taxa named by Stephen Spawls